Games held by the National Basketball Association (NBA) on Martin Luther King Jr. Day have been an annual tradition since the 1986. Unlike the more select number of Christmas Day games, more teams participate for that day. Very often a rematch of a playoff series in the previous season's NBA playoffs is showcased on MLK Day. To honor the occasion, the league generally schedules the Atlanta Hawks to host games near annually due to Atlanta being Martin Luther King Jr.'s hometown. The Memphis Grizzlies have also been hosting games annually since they relocated from Vancouver. Memphis was where King was assassinated in 1968. Although not a league tradition, the New York Knicks also have played on the holiday every single year since it was passed into law (most commonly as the home team).

Game results

MLK Day standings

References

Martin Luther King Jr. Day
1986 establishments in the United States